The Nokia 2600 is an entry-level mobile phone by Nokia running Series 30. It was first announced in April 2004 in India, and on 14 June 2004 in Singapore and Helsinki, and some time later.

It was marketed as an easy-to-use phone with a 128x128 colour display and lacking a camera, Bluetooth or a radio. It sold 135 million units, being one of the best selling phones to date. The 2600 comes preloaded with the Bounce, Mobile Soccer and Nature Park games.
(Some models included the game Millennium Mission instead of Nature Park.)
It also has a spreadsheet functionality despite lacking second functional button and its low resolution display.

Reception
CNET's Kent German gave the phone 2.5 out of 5 stars, praising its ease of use, call quality and functional feature set while unfavorably mentioning its "painfully slow" menu interface, its poor build quality and its "average" speakerphone stating in the bottom line "If it weren't for its plodding menu interface, the Nokia 2600 would be a simple and easy-to-use cell phone for communication."

See also
 List of Nokia products

References

Mobile phones introduced in 2004
2600